The 1937 World Table Tennis Championships women's doubles was the tenth edition of the women's doubles championship.
Věra Votrubcová and Vlasta Depetrisová defeated Wendy Woodhead and Margaret Osborne in the final by three sets to nil.

Results

See also
List of World Table Tennis Championships medalists

References

-
-